Vasanti Khadilkar Unni (born 1 April 1961) is an Indian chess player holding the title of Woman International Master (WIM). She won in 1974 the inaugural Indian Women's Championship.

The three Khadilkar sisters, Jayshree, Vasanti, and Rohini, dominated the Indian women's chess championships, winning all the titles in its first decade.

In 1984 Vasanti jointly won the British Ladies' Championship with Bhagyashree Sathe in Brighton.

References

External links

1961 births
Living people
Indian female chess players
Chess Woman International Masters
Sportswomen from Maharashtra
Marathi people
Place of birth missing (living people)
20th-century Indian women
20th-century Indian people
Khadilkar sisters